The Amazing Spider-Man 2: The Original Motion Picture Soundtrack is the official soundtrack from the 2014 film of the same name composed by Hans Zimmer and a supergroup called The Magnificent Six, consisting of Pharrell Williams, Mike Einziger, Junkie XL, Johnny Marr, Andrew Kawczynski, and Steve Mazzaro. It was released on April 18, 2014, through Columbia Records and Madison Gate Records.

Release and promotion
Marc Webb, director of the film, revealed on July 20, 2013, that Zimmer would compose the music for the film, following James Horner, who originally composed the music for the first film. It was later revealed that they would be forming a supergroup with Pharrell Williams to compose the film's music. Zimmer revealed the film's main theme on April 4, 2014, saying that the film's score would be different from his previous work. The soundtrack was released on April 18 in two different versions. The standard version includes a single disc with fourteen tracks of score from the film and six songs by other artists that were both used in and inspired by the film. The deluxe edition features two discs, with the first containing only the score, but with six additional tracks (several score tracks also present in the standard edition are notably longer in the deluxe edition). The second disc includes four bonus score tracks, two of them character suites, as well as all of the non-score songs from the standard version, with two additional songs.

The soundtrack features a song called "It's On Again" performed by Alicia Keys featuring Kendrick Lamar which serves as the song playing in the end credits.

Track listing

Standard edition

Deluxe edition

 Chart positions

Critical response
Reviews of the score were positive. AllMusic gave the score four stars out of five, saying "the soundtrack for The Amazing Spider-Man 2 echoes the sequel's frenetic, slick, and streamlined action, offering up 14 instrumental pieces and six non-score-related songs that dutifully reflect the measured and meticulous, corporate tie-in sensibilities of the traditional summer blockbuster while still managing to march to the beat of their own very loud drum."

Movie Wave gave the score four stars, writing "If you'd said to me while I was first listening to The Amazing Spider-Man back in 2012 (and writing about how much I hoped it might mark a return to a more traditional approach in general to these films) that two years later the sequel would come out and be scored by Hans Zimmer with dubstep, I'd probably have punched you in the face (well, if I weren't the world's most mild-mannered individual, anyway). I guess others will feel the same way. But open your mind to it: it's dazzling stuff." However, Filmtracks gave it one star out of five, heavily criticizing Zimmer's approach. Filmtracks has a long standing history of disliking Zimmer's output, and Clemmenson's complaints are painted with the broadest of brushes.

KidzWorld gave it four stars out of five, opining "The Amazing Spider-Man had a soundtrack jam-packed full of gorgeous symphonic style melodies, so expectations were high for many Marvel fans when it came to the soundtrack for The Amazing Spider-Man 2. Composer Hans Zimmer [has] created an incredibly different musical landscape for the movie, and it is just as surprising and interesting as the first soundtrack." Soundtrack Geeks gave the soundtrack 7 1/2 stars out of ten, feeling "All is not totally new territory for Zimmer. There's strong hints of earlier scores like Inception in cues like 'I Need To Know', but it is Zimmer after all, and rarely do we hear a score from him that's totally void of earlier Zimmerisms. I absolutely love this cue. 'You’re That Spider Guy' must be the ending theme or something because it feels like that kind of cue. It's got a little bit of everything and a new way to do the main Spidey theme."

Songs not included on the album
 "Amazing" - Performed by Francesca Michielin
 "Gone, Gone, Gone" - Performed by Phillip Phillips
 "Pursuit of Happiness (Steve Aoki Remix)" - Performed by Kid Cudi (featuring MGMT)
 "The Writing's on the Wall" - Performed by OK Go
 "Main Hoon" - Performed by Sanam
 "Jeopardy!" - Written by Merv Griffin
 "The Edge" - Performed by Tonight Alive

References

2014 soundtrack albums
2010s film soundtrack albums
Albums produced by Pharrell Williams
Hans Zimmer soundtracks
Pharrell Williams albums
Johnny Marr albums
Sony Music soundtracks
Spider-Man film soundtracks
Indie rock soundtracks
Pop rock soundtracks
Albums produced by Stephen Lipson
Dance-pop soundtracks
Electropop albums
Contemporary R&B soundtracks
Columbia Records soundtracks
Madison Gate Records soundtracks
The Amazing Spider-Man (2012 film series)